Psichotoe rubridorsata is a moth in the subfamily Arctiinae. It was described by Emilio Berio in 1941 and is found in Uganda.

References

Arctiidae genus list at Butterflies and Moths of the World of the Natural History Museum

Endemic fauna of Uganda
Moths described in 1941
Arctiinae